Courts is a furniture and electronics retailing brand used by stores in the Caribbean, the United States and Asia. Courts was founded in 1850 in the United Kingdom, and at its peak, Courts had 350 stores worldwide, of which one hundred were in the United Kingdom.

History
Courts was founded in 1850, by William Henry Court, with a single store in Canterbury, England. In 1945, the company was sold to the Cohen brothers, who began to expand the business. Hire purchase terms were offered from 1946. Courts was listed on London Stock Exchange in 1959. By this stage, Courts had thirty four retail stores in the United Kingdom.

In 1959, Courts expanded into the Caribbean, and opened its first store in Kingston, Jamaica. By 1965, a further store was opened in Barbados, and the product range was diversified to include electricals. Courts Jamaica listed on the Jamaica Stock Exchange in 1969. In 1978, Courts Barbados listed on the Barbados Stock Exchange.

Courts expanded into Fiji and Singapore in 1971.

Administration in the United Kingdom
In December 2001, after Courts breached a number of its banking covenants, the company's banks appointed PwC to safeguard their debts.

On Monday 29 November 2004, shares in Courts plc were suspended at 13.5p and the company went into administration, with debts of £280 million. PwC earned record fees for both pre administration and post administration work. The reasons given for entering administration were a fall in sales in the country, combined with the financial cost of the damage caused by Hurricane Ivan to the company's Caribbean arm.

The administration caused public controversy, because the sudden store closures had seen a number of outlets almost besieged and in some cases damaged by angry customers and left thousands of customers out of pocket, without the furniture they had ordered and deposits they had paid. SB Capital, owners of Furnitureland, acquired the largest number of branches.

All stores in the United Kingdom were closed, and overseas subsidiaries were sold. Courts plc was dissolved as a company.

Current operations 
Courts operates over ninety three stores in eleven Caribbean countries, including Antigua and Barbuda, Barbados, Belize, Dominica, Grenada, Guyana, Jamaica, St. Kitts and Nevis, St. Vincent and the Grenadines, St. Lucia, and Trinidad and Tobago. A store branded Courts Caribbean is located in Jamaica, New York to serve Caribbean immigrants living in the United States wishing to send gifts to family members in their countries of birth. The American store positions itself as an ethnic and nostalgic brand. 

Courts branded stores operate in Fiji and Singapore, with the latter having expanded to Indonesia. Courts also makes furniture in Fiji taking advantage of locally grown Mahogany.

Sponsorships
In June 2013, Courts Caribbean announced their sponsorship of the Caribbean Premier League "CPL's partnership with Courts is a very strategic and beneficial one to both parties, and we are thrilled about the possibilities that exist for us from a marketing perspective," said CPL CEO Damien O' Donohoe. 

"Combining our advertising and marketing programmes with that of Courts will heighten the awareness of CPL across the region, and increase fan support, which will put people in the stands at matches and customers in the aisles of Courts."

See also
Courts Malaysia
Courts Singapore

References

External links
 https://www.courts.com.fj/
 https://www.courts.com.sg/
 https://www.shopcourts.com/

Defunct retail companies of the United Kingdom
Retail companies established in 1850
Companies that have entered administration in the United Kingdom